Ernst Märzendorfer (26 May 192116 September 2009) was an Austrian conductor.

Märzendorfer was born in Oberndorf bei Salzburg. He studied with Clemens Krauss at the Mozarteum in Salzburg, and was appointed as first conductor of the Graz Opera in 1945.  He conducted at the Teatro Colón in Buenos Aires in the early 1950s.  In 1954 he became a guest conductor at the Salzburg Festival.  From 1953 to 1958, he was the principal conductor of the Mozarteum Orchestra of Salzburg, and led several tours with the orchestra, including a highly acclaimed American tour.

He was appointed musical director of the Salzburg Festival in Hellbrunn in 1976, where his highlights included twenty stage works by Jacques Offenbach. He was permanent conductor at the Vienna State Opera in from 1961, and often appeared at the Berlin State Opera. In 1979 he revived Franz Schmidt's opera Fredigundis.

He died aged 88 in Vienna.

Premieres
Märzendorfer's first performances of Richard Strauss's works included: 
 the New York premiere of Capriccio
 the Rome premiere of Der Rosenkavalier
 the Berlin premiere of Die Frau ohne Schatten
 the Salzburg premiere of Strauss's last opera Des Esels Schatten (left incomplete by Strauss; orchestrated and completed by Karl Haussner)
 the Vienna premiere of the first version of the symphonic poem Macbeth.

His Richard Wagner premieres included:
 the first performances in Naples and Rome of Siegfried
 the Berlin premiere of Parsifal.

Other premieres were:
 the world premieres of Hans Werner Henze's Tancredi and The Idiot (in Vienna), and
 the Vienna State Opera premiere of Igor Stravinsky's Les noces.

Recordings
Recordings of note included:
 The first complete set of Haydn symphonies, which were virtually unknown due to limited US-only distribution.
 Vincenzo Bellini:  I Capuleti e i Montecchi
 Georges Bizet: Carmen
 Emilio de' Cavalieri: Rappresentatione di Anima, et di Corpo
 Gaetano Donizetti: Lucia di Lammermoor
 Giacomo Meyerbeer: Les Huguenots
 Giuseppe Verdi: Aida, La traviata and Nabucco
 Harp concertos by Mozart, Boieldieu, Rodrigo, Handel, Spohr and others, with Nicanor Zabaleta
 Alberto Ginastera: Piano Concerto No. 1
 he recorded volumes 3, 4, 7, 10, 12 and 18 of the complete edition of Johann Strauss I's works with the Slovak Sinfonietta, and volume 17 of the music of Josef Strauss, with the Kosice Slovak State Philharmonic Orchestra.
Bruckner Symphony 0, with ORF Symphony Orchestra

References 

Male conductors (music)
Mozarteum University Salzburg alumni
People from Salzburg-Umgebung District
1921 births
2009 deaths
20th-century Austrian conductors (music)
20th-century Austrian male musicians